Waverley Borough Council v Fletcher [1995] 4 All ER 756 is an English Court of Appeal case.

Facts
The defendant was using a metal detector in a park owned by the claimant council. The defendant found a brooch and reported this to the authorities. The Coroner decided that it was not treasure trove. The issue was then who could claim the brooch - the claimant or the defendant.

Judgment
The Court of Appeal held that the council had the better right to the brooch. As it had been found within or attached to the land, rather than on the surface, it belonged to the person who owned the soil.

See also
English property law

Notes

References

English property case law
Court of Appeal (England and Wales) cases
1995 in British law
1995 in case law